A Motley Vision is an online multi-author blog featuring criticism of the Mormon arts, Latter Day Saints (LDS) literature and film in particular. It was launched by William Morris on June 2, 2004. It won the Association for Mormon Letters award for criticism in 2005 for "Its writers have made serious efforts to give sustained discussion to important issues, rather than simply aggregating fragments and chatter. The organization and coherence of the site, with its archives and references, has made possible the very sort of communal discussion of art and literature that AML encourages at its conferences, but does so asynchronously and electronically, allowing a greater breadth of participation across space and time."

AMV frequently runs interviews with or essays from significant figures in the Mormon arts, such as Coke Newell and Mormons who have had significant national success such as Stephenie Meyer. The site's criticism is occasionally cited in promotional materials and in scholarly notices.

AMV's critical efforts also include AMV Projects, among which are an online literary journal "devoted to the work of Twilight author Stephenie Meyer," a "free-content multilingual dictionary of Mormon words and phrases" and a translation project.

See also 

Bloggernacle
Culture of The Church of Jesus Christ of Latter-day Saints
Film criticism
LDS Poetry
List of blogs
Literary criticism
Mormon literature

References

External links
Official site

American blogs
Blogs about Mormons and Mormonism
Internet properties established in 2004
Mormon literature